Lambda Beta Alpha is a national military Greek-lettered sorority whose mission is to promote and foster a sisterhood among women from all branches of the United States Armed Forces regardless of service status, active duty, national guard, reserve, veteran or retired; to study and help alleviate problems concerning female service members during and after their time in the military; to maintain a global presence through community service and philanthropic efforts; and to serve as a resource of information for young girls and women considering a military career, as well as those transitioning out of the military.

History
Lambda Beta Alpha Sorority was founded on November 10, 2017  in Virginia by 10 women who served in the U.S. Military. It was incorporated on December 4, 2017. Originally called "Lambda Beta Alpha Sorority, Inc." the organization changed its name to "Lambda Beta Alpha Military Sorority, Inc." in 2018 to ensure its name reflected the nature of its membership.

Founders
The Lambda Beta Alpha founders, known as the "Original X", were:

Affiliations

On August 1, 2018, the Lambda Beta Alpha national officers, under the guidance of their visionary and national president, Tarama Giles, founded the Orchids of Lambda, which is the first auxiliary organization within the military Greek-letter community. The "Orchids" are female military relatives (i.e. spouse, mother, sister, daughter, aunt, cousin), supporters (significant other, friend, etc...), ROTC cadets, and those desiring to enter the military; age 18 and older.

The Military Women's Coalition  is national group of formal and information organizations who work collaboratively to serve and support US active duty, reserve, Guard, Veteran and retired service women by uniting and elevating their voices to influence policy and improve their well-being. Lambda Beta Alpha joined the Coalition in its infancy  and is currently the only military Greek-letter organization involved.

Citations, proclamations, and recognitions

Nancy McFarlane, Mayor of the City of Raleigh, North Carolina proclaimed May 25, 2019 as Honor Our Female Veterans Day, with the coordination of Lambda Beta Alpha. 
United States Senator and member of the United States Senate Committee on Armed Services, Tammy Duckworth, issued a letter recognizing Mary 25th as "Honor Our Female Veterans Day".
Governor of Maryland, Larry Hogan, issued a Governor's Citation to Lambda Beta Alpha for Founders' Day for "demonstration of high integrity and ability, meriting our great trust and respect"

Lambda Beta Alpha has also received warm wishes and congratulations for the establishment of the sorority, celebration of their Founders' Day, and recognition for their work in the community. Such notables include Governor of Texas Greg Abbott,  Governor of Virginia Ralph Northam, Congressman Gerry Connolly, Senators Mark Warner and Tim Kaine, and Mayor of Suffolk, Virginia Linda Johnson

Partnerships

Snow Leopard Trust
Military Child Education Coalition
Psych Hub
Women Veterans Alliance

Distinguished Honorary Members

On December 21, 2019, Lambda Beta Alpha inducted Michele S. Jones, retired Command Sergeant Major of the U.S. Army Reserves and Perlisa D. Wilson, Command Sergeant Major of the Maryland National Guard as Distinguished Honorary Members.

See also
Professional fraternities and sororities
Service fraternities and sororities

References

External links
Lambda Beta Alpha Military Sorority, Inc. Official Website
Orchids of Lambda Official Website

Professional military fraternities and sororities in the United States